Parminolia is a genus of sea snails, marine gastropod mollusks in the family Trochidae, the top snails.

Species
 Parminolia apicina (Gould, A.A., 1861)

References

 Ladd, H.S. (1966). Chitons and gastropods (Haliotidae through Adeorbidae) from the western Pacific Islands. United States Geological Survey, Professional Paper. 531
 Wilson, B. (1993). Australian Marine Shells. Prosobranch Gastropods. Kallaroo, WA : Odyssey Publishing. Vol.1 1st Edn

External links
 To World Register of Marine Species

 
Monotypic gastropod genera